Langstroth may refer to:

Agnes Langstroth (1498–1530), alleged granddaughter of Edward IV
 L. L. Langstroth (1810–1895), U.S. clergyman and beekeeper, after whom is named:
 Langstroth Cottage, a historic building in Oxford, Ohio
 Langstroth hive, a design of beehive
 Dawn Langstroth (born 1979), Canadian singer–songwriter

See also
 Langstrothdale, a valley in the Yorkshire Dales in North Yorkshire, England